Yayla is a quarter of the town Ardeşen, Ardeşen District, Rize Province, northeastern Turkey. Its population is 337 (2021).

History 
According to list of villages in Laz language book (2009), name of the neighbourhood is Okordule. Most inhabitants of the neighbourhood are ethnically Laz.

References

Populated places in Ardeşen District
Laz settlements in Turkey